Jason Wulf (known by the tag DG or DGOne) was a Queens-based graffiti artist. He worked as a carpenter and sign painter.

Wulf started doing graffiti in 1985, making images of cartoons as well as tagging. Later in his career, he began selling commercial graffiti through art galleries. He was the founder of a graffiti crew known as "New Wave Crew" and a member of "Mad Subway Demons". Wulf continued to graffiti during the MTA's Clean Train Movement era, when tagged cars were constantly being removed from service, and he was arrested 13 times. Wulf died in 2014, while crossing the tracks at the 25th subway station in Sunset Park. To commemorate him, graffiti artists tagged walls and made murals across New York.

See also
 List of graffiti and street art injuries and deaths
 Graffiti in New York City

External links
 Pro Bono: Protecting Art, Sealing Legacies – The Story of Jason Wulf
 Wulf painting a canvas
 Wulf's blog with his work

References

American graffiti artists
Graffiti and unauthorised signage
2014 deaths